Charles Albert Reynolds (November 10, 1848 – July 2, 1936) was a civil engineer and North Carolina Republican politician who served as the eighth Lieutenant Governor of North Carolina from 1897 to 1901 under 

Governor Daniel L. Russell. Limited to one term in office by the state constitution of the time, Reynolds later ran unsuccessfully for the U.S. House of Representatives from North Carolina's 5th congressional district in 1904 and 1906 (losing both times to William W. Kitchin). He is buried in the churchyard of the Episcopal Church of the Epiphany in Eden, North Carolina.

References
The Political Graveyard
OurCampaigns.com

1848 births
1936 deaths
Lieutenant Governors of North Carolina
American civil engineers
North Carolina Republicans